Patricia (Tish) Prain later Tish Pike (born 2 September 1933) is an alpine skier from New Zealand. 
 
She competed for New Zealand at the 1960 Winter Olympics at Oslo, and came 36th in the Downhill, 32nd in the Slalom and 34th in the Giant Slalom.

References 
 Black Gold by Ron Palenski (2008, 2004 New Zealand Sports Hall of Fame, Dunedin) p. 107

External links 
 
 

Living people
1933 births
New Zealand female alpine skiers
Olympic alpine skiers of New Zealand
Alpine skiers at the 1960 Winter Olympics